The Institute of Management Consultants USA (IMC USA) is the professional association and the sole certifying body for individual management consultants in the United States. It awards the Certified Management Consultant (CMC) as evidence of professional consulting experience, technical competence, knowledge and skills in consulting processes, client satisfaction and adherence to rigorous ethical standards. The CMC is recognized by and accorded reciprocity in 46 countries and accredited by the International Council of Management Consulting Institutes (ICMCI).

Founded in 1968, IMC USA's mission is to "promote excellence and ethics in management consulting through certification, education and professional resources." It provides professional development resources and events, business management resources, certification and business development support to members in its 20 chapters in major U.S. cities. It holds a national conference every year, conducts surveys of business and consulting, offers a consultant search service, publishes a set of professional standards, has a Code of Ethics and enforcement procedures, and maintains the Management Consulting Common Body of Knowledge and a Management Consulting Competency Framework, both of which support its certification process. IMC USA members represent almost every industry and consulting discipline and work as consultants in global consulting firms, boutique firms and independent consulting practices, and as internal consultants in non-consulting firms, non-profits and public sector organizations.

In 2010, The Institute of Management Consultants USA (IMC USA) has been accredited for its Certified Management Consultants (CMC®) certification process by the International Organization for Standardization (ISO).

References

External links
Official site
International Council of Management Consulting Institutes
IMC Confab Consulting Seminar and Consultant Conference

Professional associations based in the United States
1968 establishments in the United States
Organizations established in 1968
Management consulting firms of the United States